Instefjord is a small village in Gulen Municipality in Vestland county, Norway. It is located at the southern end of the Risnefjorden, a small arm that branches off the main Sognefjorden. The European route E39 highway runs through the village on its way from the city of Bergen to the city of Førde. Fish farming and agriculture are the main industries in Instefjord.

References

External links
Map of the Instefjord area

Gulen
Villages in Vestland